Gautier–Wehrlé was a French manufacturer of steam, petrol and electric powered vehicles from 1894-1900.

History
The company 'Rossel, Gautier et Wehrlé' of Paris was founded in 1894 to produce steam powered automobiles, and was renamed Société Centrale in 1896. Production ceased in 1900. Charles Gautier later founded Gautier et Cie.

Vehicles
Two cars were entered in the Paris–Bordeaux–Paris but neither finished.

In 1896, the 8 hp model used a gasoline engine, three-speed transmission and shaft drive. In 1898 they offered several single-cylinder models from 5 hp to 12 hp, a model with a two-cylinder engine, and electric cars.

Licensing
Linon from Belgium made some models under license.

References

 G.N. Georgano, Complete Encyclopédie of Motor Cars. 1885 to the Present.

Defunct motor vehicle manufacturers of France
Car manufacturers of France
Vehicle manufacturing companies disestablished in 1900
French companies established in 1896
1900 disestablishments in France
Vehicle manufacturing companies established in 1896
Manufacturing companies based in Paris